Baronick Glacier is a glacier  southwest of Mount Cocks, in the Royal Society Range, draining into the Skelton Glacier to the west. It was named by the Advisory Committee on Antarctic Names in 1963 for Chief Aviation Ordnanceman Michael P. Baronick, of U.S. Navy Squadron VX-6, who wintered at Williams Air Operating Facility at McMurdo Sound in 1956 and was in Antarctica for several summer seasons.

See also
 List of glaciers in the Antarctic
 Glaciology

References 

 

Glaciers of Hillary Coast